"Could I Be Your Girl" is a song by Jann Arden, released as a single in 1994 from her second album Living Under June. The song reached number three in Canada and topped the country's RPM Adult Contemporary chart for one week. In the United States, the song was Arden's first single to chart, reaching number 33 on the Billboard Adult Contemporary chart. The song won the 1995 Juno Award for Single of the Year.

Unusually for songs by Jann Arden, "Could I Be Your Girl" also had a dance remix version which circulated on Canadian pop radio shortly after the release of the original version. This song was included on Arden's 2001 greatest hits album, Greatest Hurts.

Charts

Weekly charts

Year-end charts

References

1994 singles
Jann Arden songs
Juno Award for Single of the Year singles
1994 songs
A&M Records singles